Ağbulaq is a village in the Lachin District of Azerbaijan. Historically, the village had a Kurdish population.

History 
Formerly part of Red Kurdistan and later the Kurdistan Okrug, the village was located in the Armenian-occupied territories surrounding Nagorno-Karabakh, coming under the control of ethnic Armenian forces in 1992 during the First Nagorno-Karabakh War. The village subsequently became part of the breakaway Republic of Artsakh as part of its Kashatagh Province, referred to as Spitakajur. It was returned to Azerbaijan as part of the 2020 Nagorno-Karabakh ceasefire agreement.

References

External links 

 

Populated places in Lachin District
Kurdish villages in Azerbaijan
Kurdish diaspora